Giant slalom (GS) is an alpine skiing and alpine snowboarding competitive discipline. It involves racing between sets of poles ("gates") spaced at a greater distance from each other than in slalom but less than in Super-G.

Giant slalom and slalom make up the technical events in alpine ski racing. This category separates them from the speed events of Super-G and downhill.  The technical events are normally composed of two runs, held on different courses on the same ski run.

Course
The number of gates in this event is 56–70 for men and 46–58 for women. The number of direction changes in a GS course equals 11–15% of the vertical drop of the course in metres, 13–18% for children. As an example, a course with a vertical drop of  would have 33–45 direction changes for an adult race.

Speed

Equipment

Giant slalom skis are shorter than super-G and downhill skis, and longer than slalom skis.

In May 2006, the FIS announced further changes to the rules governing equipment.

Many athletes criticized this decision. Often David Dodge was cited. Dodge argues that FIS used studies which do not represent a scientific proof. He states that it is well known that if one tips the ski 7° more the 35 m ski will have the same turning radius as the 28 m ski. He states as well that knee injuries are decreasing since the 1990s, when carving skis started to be used.

History
The first giant slalom was set in 1935 on the Mottarone in Italy, over Lake Maggiore, near Stresa, on January 20.
After one month, the second giant slalom was set on the Marmolada in Italy's Dolomite mountains, by Guenther Langes.

The giant slalom was added to the world championships in 1950 at Aspen, Colorado, and debuted at the Winter Olympics in 1952 at Oslo, Norway, run at Norefjell.  The GS has been run in every world championships and Olympics since. Originally a one-run event, a second run was added for men at the world championships in 1966, run on consecutive days, and at the Olympics in 1968. The second run for women was added at the world championships in 1978, and made its Olympic debut in 1980.

The world championships changed to a one-day format for the giant slalom in 1974, but the Olympics continued the GS as a two-day event through 1980. Also scheduled for two days in 1984, both giant slaloms became one-day events after repeated postponements of the downhills. Following the extra races added to the program in 1988, the GS has been scheduled as a one-day event at the Olympics.

Upon its introduction, giant slalom briefly displaced the combined event at the world championships; it was absent in 1950 and 1952. The combined returned in 1954 in Åre, Sweden, but as a "paper race," using the results of the three events (downhill, giant slalom, and slalom), a format used through 1980. The combined returned as a stand-alone event at the world championships in 1982 at Schladming, Austria, and at the 1988 Calgary Olympics. It was changed to the super-combined format (one run of slalom on same day as downhill) at the world championships in 2007 and the Olympics in 2010.

Men's World Cup podiums
In the following table men's giant slalom World Cup podiums from the World Cup first edition in 1967.

Men's most podiums in World Cup
Racers with the most World Cup podiums in giant slalom.

Totals through 19 December 2022

Women's World Cup podiums
In the following table women's giant slalom World Cup podiums from the World Cup first edition in 1967.

See also
List of Olympic medalists in men's giant slalom
List of Olympic medalists in women's giant slalom
List of Paralympic medalists in men's giant slalom
List of Paralympic medalists in women's giant slalom
List of World Champions in giant slalom

References

External links

Alpine skiing
Italian inventions
Games and sports introduced in 1935

fr:Ski alpin#Slalom géant